Harold Joseph "Pat" Hintz (February 4, 1914 – February 22, 2004) was an American professional basketball player. He played in the National Basketball League for the Toledo Jim White Chevrolets for both seasons the franchise existed and averaged 8.0 points per game for his career.

References

External links 
University of Toledo Hall of Fame profile

1914 births
2004 deaths
American men's basketball players
United States Marine Corps personnel of World War II
Basketball players from Ohio
Guards (basketball)
High school basketball coaches in the United States
Sportspeople from Massillon, Ohio
Toledo Jim White Chevrolets players
Toledo Rockets men's basketball players